Kadiwéu is a Guaicuruan language spoken by the Kadiweu people of Brazil, and historically by other Mbayá groups. It has around 1,200-1,800 people in Brazil. It is mainly a subject–verb–object language.

The name Kadiweu has variants such as Kaduveo, Caduveo, Kadivéu, and Kadiveo. This language is spoken near the Brazil-Paraguay border in the state of Mato Grosso do Sul. The nearest town is Bodoquena, which is 60 kilometers away. According to data collected in 1999 by FUNAI, the total population of the Kadiwéu is 1,014; however, more recent data collected in 2014 shows that the population increased to 1,413 over the past couple of years, while the most recently researched data (from 1976) showed that there were 500 speakers of the language. None of the works on Kadiweu discussed the level of endangerment.

In terms of the linguistic literature on Kadiweu, linguists Glyn and Cynthia Griffiths published an entire Kadiweu–Portuguese dictionary in 2002. Glyn Griffiths also translated the Old and New Testament of the Bible into Kadiweu. Linguist Filomena Sandalo, who worked with the Kadiweu people for a couple of years, offers an extensive analysis of the morphological components of the language.

Projects that began working with Kadiweu were created in the mid 1950s. However, they were short lived due to unexplained reasons. However, in 1968 the Griffiths partnered with SIL (Sociedade Internacional de Lingüística), which led to the documentation of the Kadiweu language. Their book Aspectos da Língua Kadiweu discussed the formation and grammatical structure of the language. Moreover, an influential source according to Povo Indigenas no Brazil is the 18th-century ethnographic account of Kadiwéu by F. José Sanchez-Labrador. These are just some of the many writings on the language that uncover the vast and complex language that is Kadiweu.

History 
The first accounts of the Kadiwéu people date back to the 16th century, where European expeditions documented the existence of this indigenous people. The Kadiwéu people were often referred to as the "horseman Indians." However, as the centuries went by the group found itself stuck between the two imperial powers of Spain and Portugal. During the wars between Paraguay and Brazil, the Kadiwéu fought on the latter side. This ensured that the Kadiwéu held the rights to their territory. Nevertheless, in recent times the relations between Kadiwéu and cattle ranchers has become more hostile. This is due to the penetration of cattle farmers into the original Kadiwéu lands, which were gained by fighting and sacrificing their lives. However, as of the 1950s cattle ranchers have gained official permission from the SPI (Indian Protective Service) to usurp the Kadiwéu territory to raise cattle on.

Phonology

Vowels 

 /e eː/ can often be heard as close mid [ɛ ɛː].
 /o oː/ is heard as [u uː] when before dental consonants.
 /a/ is realized as [ʌ] before a uvular consonant.
 /a/ before /e/ can then be heard as a long vowel sound [æː].

Consonants 

 Allophones of sounds /d͡ʒ/ is heard as [ʒ] in free variation among speakers.
 /ɢ/ is typically heard as a uvular fricative [ʁ].
 /d/ is heard as a tap [ɾ] within intervocalic positions.

Grammar 
Kadiweu has interesting linguistic aspects that highlight and distinguish it from other native languages. The work of linguist Maria Filomena Sandalo, A Grammar of Kadiweu, presents a general description of the language. Sandalo highlights and analyzes the morphological aspects of Kadiweu.

Morphology

Valency 
Valency is defined as "the number and type of bonds which the verb may form with a number of dependent elements referred to as arguments" (Sandalo 1995). Valency change is the number of arguments controlled by a verbal predicate. While there are two types of valency change, reducing and increasing, after analyzing Sandalo's data it appears that Kadiweu has an increasing valency change. This author uses valency change to refer to the syntactically relevant components of meaning specified in the lexicon of Kadiweu (Sandalo 1995). She claims that the [+cause] and [+become] features of the language must be added as suffixes in order for the verb to become a predicate. She proposes that the suffixes operate by adding or deleting the [+cause] and or [+become] feature. For example, as seen in example 278 below, the root is a verb. However, in example 279 a suffix that denotes [+cause] is added which changes the meaning of the sentence.

She claims that verbs are lexically specified for [+cause] and [+become] and that they fit into three categories. The first category is monovalent verbs, where there is only one semantic argument and it consists of both unergative verbs and unaccusative verbs. An example of a monovalent verb is seen in example (280) below. It is important to note that non-accusative verbs only take an internal argument, and within their semantics is something that undergoes a change of state, ([+become]). However, non-ergative verbs take an external argument, and the idea of something causing what is being expressed ([+cause]) is expressed in their meaning. As a result, the implied meaning in the example below is 'I cause yelling' rather than just 'I yell'.

The second category is bivalent verbs, which make an obligatory reference to the subject and cause of become. For example, the author shows how the verb "eat" can also be a bivalent verb because it requires two semantic arguments, as seen in example (282) below. Sandalo expresses the action of bivalent verbs as an equation which states "x cause y become STATE." This formula is shown in the implied meaning 'I cause guava (to) become eaten':

The third category is trivalent verbs which make an obligatory reference to a third party argument. The formula Sandalo uses to explain these verbs is: x cause y become LOCATION. This formula is explained in example (283) below

In Kadiweu, suffixes can be added to the verb to alter the meaning of the verb. Sandalo identifies four types of suffixes that can be added: [+cause], [-cause], [+become], and [-beccome]. By adding these suffixes to a verb, valency change occurs. For example, in example (284) below a bare root is shown. Since it is non-accusative, the implied meaning contains [+become] thus making it 'his knife becomes sharpened'. However, in example (285) when the [+cause] suffix –Gad is added to the non-accusative verb it creates a bivalent (x cause y become STATE) verb:

In conclusion, while Sandalo does not explicitly state that this is an increasing valency change, she identifies a causative suffix which is a typical valency-increasing device. As a result, Kadiweu uses these various suffixes to express valency change.

Tense 
According to Sandalo, Kadiweu "has no tense markers" but rather aspect, which is marked on the verb. These aspects mark the duration or type of temporal activity. In Kadiweu, there are seven aspectual markers: completive, incompletive, durative, telic, atelic, repetitive, and intensive.

The first aspect, completive, marked with, jaG+, means that the event has been completed (61).

The second aspect, incompletive, bGa+, is added when the event is not complete but the event has not taken place yet (62).

The third aspect, durative, marked by banaGa+, which stresses the event occurring, regardless of when it and if it will happen (63).

The fourth, being telic events, have a clear terminal point. These events are marked by the suffix -g (64).

The fifth are atelic events, which are marked by -d. This aspect has no natural point (65).

For the sixth and seventh aspects, repetitive and intensive, marked by +ak and +bigi, the author does not explain or go into detail about it.

References

External links 
 ELAR archive of Kadiwéu (and Chorote and Nivaklé) language documentation materials

Guaicuruan languages
Endangered Guaicuruan languages
Languages of Brazil
Chaco linguistic area